In natural selection, negative selection  or purifying selection is the selective removal of alleles that are deleterious. This can result in stabilising selection through the purging of deleterious genetic polymorphisms that arise through random mutations.

Purging of deleterious alleles can be achieved on the population genetics level, with as little as a single point mutation being the unit of selection. In such a case, carriers of the harmful point mutation have fewer offspring each generation, reducing the frequency of the mutation in the gene pool.

In the case of strong negative selection on a locus, the purging of deleterious variants will result in the occasional removal of linked variation, producing a decrease in the level of variation surrounding the locus under selection. The incidental purging of non-deleterious alleles due to such spatial proximity to deleterious alleles is called background selection. This effect increases with  lower mutation rate but decreases with higher recombination rate.

Purifying selection can be split into purging by non-random mating (assortative mating) and purging by genetic drift. Purging by genetic drift can remove primarily deeply recessive alleles, whereas natural selection can remove any type of deleterious alleles.

See also 

 Assortative mating
 Balancing selection
 Directional selection
 Disruptive selection
 Dysgenics
 Fluctuating selection
 Genetic purging
 Koinophilia
 Mutation–selection balance
 Stabilizing selection

References 

Selection
Classical genetics
Population genetics